VST may refer to:

 Vancouver School of Theology, a theological graduate school in British Columbia, Canada
 VST, Stockholm Västerås Airport in Sweden (IATA airport code)
 Vehicle safety technology
 Virtual Studio Technology, Steinberg's standard for audio plug-ins
 in particular, may refer to some versions of the Steinberg Cubase program
 Towner Railway (reporting mark)
 VLT Survey Telescope, a wide-field telescope on Cerro Paranal, Chile
 Venezuela Standard Time, Venezuela's time zone
 VST Industries, Hyderabad, India
 VST (album)
 Public Security Service, a Lithuanian law enforcement agency